In cryptanalysis, a kiss is a pair of identical messages sent using different ciphers, one of which has been broken. The term was used at Bletchley Park during World War II. A deciphered message in the breakable system provided a "crib" (piece of known plaintext) which could then be used to read the unbroken messages. One example was where messages read in a German meteorological cipher could be used to provide cribs for reading the difficult 4-wheel Naval Enigma cipher.

cribs from re-encipherments .... were known as 'kisses' in Bletchley Park parlance because the relevant signals were marked with  'xx'

See also
Cryptanalysis of the Enigma
Known-plaintext attack

References 

Smith, Michael and Erskine, Ralph (editors): Action this Day (2001, Bantam London) 

Bletchley Park
Classical cryptography
Cryptographic attacks